Francis Mears was an English priest in the 17th-century.

Meres was educated at Trinity College, Cambridge,  He was ordained in 1632. Meres was Headmaster of Uppingham School from 1641 to 1666; and held the livings at Wardley, Teigh and Misterton. He was Archdeacon of Leicester from 1679 until his death on 27 August 1683.

Notes 

Alumni of Trinity College, Cambridge
1683 deaths
Rutland
Archdeacons of Leicester
Headmasters of Uppingham School
17th-century English Anglican priests